Callum Jeffrey McFadzean (born 16 January 1994) is a professional footballer who plays as a left sided wing-back for National League side Wrexham. His versatility has also seen him play as a centre-back.

Born in Sheffield, England, he came through the ranks at his home-town club, has also represented England at under-16 level, but has since opted to play for Scotland at under-21 level. He had loan spells with Chesterfield, Burton Albion and Stevenage. He then joined Kilmarnock before spells with non-league Alfreton Town and Guiseley. He then had one-year spells at Bury, Plymouth Argyle and Sunderland, and half a season at Crewe Alexandra.

Club career

Sheffield United 
A product of Sheffield United's Academy McFadzean was a member of the team that reached the final of the FA Youth Cup in 2011, scoring in the first leg of the final against Manchester United. He was eventually promoted to the senior squad and made his professional début in the first game of the 2012–13 season, a League Cup tie against Burton Albion. Now on the fringes of the first team and regularly securing a place on the bench, McFadzean made his first start for the Blades in the Johnstones Paint Trophy against Coventry City at the Ricoh Arena. Following a handful of substitute appearances that season, McFadzean was handed a more prominent role by caretaker manager Chris Morgan following the departure of Danny Wilson in April 2012. After a number of first-team starts at the tail end of the season, McFadzean came off the bench to score the winning goal in the first leg of United's play-off semi-final against Yeovil Town. Following his successful end to the season McFadzean had had his contract with the Blades extended in June 2013.

Loan spells 
McFadzean started the following season as part of the first team but was sidelined by injury during September. Following the arrival of new United manager Nigel Clough, McFadzean joined Chesterfield in November 2013 on a short-term loan. McFadzean returned to his parent club in January 2014 after making five appearances for Chesterfield, but remained out of United's first team picture, and in March 2014, McFadzean joined League Two side Burton Albion on an initial one-month loan. McFadzean remained with Burton for the remainder of the season, scoring one goal and making ten appearances for his temporary employers, including playing in Burton's unsuccessful appearance in the play-off final at Wembley.

On 3 July 2014, McFadzean rejoined Burton Albion on a six-month loan deal. On 7 October 2014, McFadzean was ruled out for up to two months after breaking his fifth metatarsal bone in a match against Cambridge United.

On 26 November 2015, McFadzean joined Stevenage on a one-month loan. At the end of the 2015–16 season, he was released by Sheffield United.

Kilmarnock 

On 24 June 2016, McFadzean signed for Scottish Premiership club Kilmarnock.

Alfreton Town 

McFadzean moved to Alfreton Town in March 2017. He was released by the club at the end of the season.

Guiseley 
In July 2017 he signed for Guiseley after a successful trial.

Bury 
After a year with Guiseley, he was on the move again in August 2018, this time signing a six-month contract with Bury after a successful trial with the Gigg Lane club. On 26 October 2018, McFadzean was offered a contract extension to the end of the 2018–19 season.

Plymouth Argyle 
After Bury were expelled from the Football League, McFadzean joined Plymouth Argyle, making his debut on the opening day of the 2019–20 season as Argyle won 3–0 against Crewe Alexandra. In July 2020, McFadzean turned down a new contract with Plymouth Argyle.

Sunderland
On 21 October 2020, McFadzean joined League One side Sunderland on a one-year deal. McFadzean made his debut in the FA Cup against Mansfield Town on 7 November 2020. He scored his first goal for Sunderland on 10 November 2020 in an EFL Trophy group game against Fleetwood Town. On 25 May 2021 it was announced that he would leave Sunderland at the end of the season, following the expiry of his contract.

Crewe Alexandra
On 30 July 2021, he was announced as manager David Artell's fifth summer signing at League One rivals Crewe Alexandra, signing a one-year contract. He made his Crewe debut in a League Cup first round tie at Hartlepool United on 10 August 2021, but made just four further appearances before leaving the club by mutual consent in January 2022.

Wrexham
On 27 January 2022, McFadzean signed for National League club Wrexham on a two-and-a-half year deal.

International career
McFadzean made five appearances for England's under-16 squad during the 2009–10 season. McFadzean is also eligible to represent Scotland due to his Scottish heritage. He was selected for the Scotland under-21 squad in March 2015.

Personal life
McFadzean was born in Sheffield and continues to live in the Waterthorpe district of the city. He is the younger brother of Coventry City defender Kyle McFadzean, who also started his career at Bramall Lane.

Assault charges
In October 2013, McFadzean was released on bail after being charged with two counts of assault and two counts of threatening behaviour after an incident in Sheffield city centre earlier the same month. McFadzean pleaded guilty to two charges of assault when his case came to court in November 2013, admitting to hitting one female friend and headbutting another while drunk. As a result, he was given a community order with 12 months' supervision.

Career statistics

Honours
Bury
League Two runner-up: 2018–19

Plymouth Argyle
League Two promotion: 2019–20

Sunderland
EFL Trophy: 2020–21

Wrexham
FA Trophy runner-up: 2021–22

References

External links
 
 Official profile at Sheffield United F.C.
 England profile at theFA.com
 

1994 births
Living people
Footballers from Sheffield
Association football midfielders
English footballers
Scottish footballers
English people of Scottish descent
England youth international footballers
Sheffield United F.C. players
Chesterfield F.C. players
Burton Albion F.C. players
Stevenage F.C. players
English Football League players
Scotland under-21 international footballers
Kilmarnock F.C. players
Scottish Professional Football League players
Alfreton Town F.C. players
Guiseley A.F.C. players
Bury F.C. players
Plymouth Argyle F.C. players
Crewe Alexandra F.C. players
Wrexham A.F.C. players
National League (English football) players